Kenneth Michael Marks (November 6, 1950 – October 31, 2018) was an American Christian singer.

Early life and education
Marks' father Mirko “Michael” Mrakovic and mother Ljubica “Lucy” Vukic came from Yugoslavia. His parents changed the name Mrakovic to Marks three months before he was born. His father was born in today’s Croatia in 1922 and first moved to Canada before settling in the USA.  Growing up in Detroit, Marks studied classical piano and learned to play guitar at age 13. He graduated from Messiah College in Philadelphia in 1971. While in college he was the drummer in a contemporary Christian group, the Fellowship.

Career
Marks began performing for Billy Graham's Afterglow Concert Series. In 1981 he participated in a project called "Premiere Performance" by Myrrh Records. His song was on an album with songs by various artists and an invitation for buyers to vote for their favorite who would then be offered a full contract with the Christian recording label. Marks was the fans choice.

Marks' first album Follow Him was released on Myrrh Records in 1982. With his second album 1984's Right Where You Are, he began to find his own definitive style as an artist and wanting to sing about relationships.

In the 1990s, Marks became a host on the Nashville based Shop at Home TV Network.

Music
Jeannie and Johnny, a fictitious Franklin High School couple created by Marks, appear on his albums Attitude (1985) and Make It Right (1987). In the song, "Growing Up Too Fast" they are two individual kids dealing separately with emotions and impulses. In "The Party's Over, they meet at a party and get together in the back seat of Johnny's car, resulting in a pregnancy that robs them of their carefree teenage lifestyle. On the album Another Friday Night, with the song, "Next Time You See Johnny", Johnny has left Jeannie with their son, who is who's old enough to hurt over Daddy's leaving, and innocent enough to hold forgiveness in his heart for Johnny. "Fire of Forgiveness" is the fourth and final song, a reflection of Johnny looking back on his life. He sang another song "Friends", which was the theme song for the dramatic segment on the series Fire by Nite called "Friends".

The song "Say a Prayer for Me Tonight" reflects on a true story when a young man named Richard talked to Marks after a concert in Philadelphia on his Make It Right tour and asked Marks to pray for him and then shared some songs he had written. Three weeks later Marks learned that Richard had committed suicide.

"White Dress", which began as a song for Marks' daughter Allegra on her first birthday, tells the story of a girl growing up abandoned by her father, and then becoming a mother.

Personal life
Marks was married to Pamela Marks for twenty-four years; she co-wrote some of his songs. They divorced in 1997.

Marks died of a heart attack on October 31, 2018.

Discography
 Follow Him 1982
 Right Where You Are 1984
 Attitude 1986
 Make It Right 1987
 Another Friday Night 1990
 Fire of Forgiveness 1992
 Absolutely Positively 1994
 World Gone Mad 1995
 Best That I Can 2015

References

External links
 Official website

2018 deaths
1950 births
American male singers
Singers from Detroit
Messiah University alumni
American gospel singers
American people of Yugoslav descent